Coladenia laxmi  is a butterfly in the family Hesperiidae. It was described by Lionel de Nicéville in 1889. It is found in the Indomalayan realm.

Subspecies
C. l. laxmi (Burma, Thailand)
C. l. sobrina Elwes & Edwards, 1897  (southern Burma, Thailand, Laos, Peninsular Malaysia, Tioman, Sumatra, Hainan)

References

External links
Coladenia at Markku Savela's Lepidoptera and Some Other Life Forms

Hesperiidae genera
Butterflies described in 1889